This is a list of family relations in professional wrestling. Since the beginning of the artforms secretive history family members have been involved in all aspects of the industry, often to keep it closed off to outsiders. Although most connections are among wrestlers, there have been contributions from family members in many other fields, such as managing, promoting, training and refereeing.

Siblings

Full

Half

Adopted, step and foster

Parents–children

Biological

Adopted, step and foster

Grandparent–grandchildren

Biological

Adopted, step and foster

Great grandparent–great grandchildren

Biological

Adopted, step and foster

Aunts and uncles–niblings

Regular

Half

Adopted, step and foster

Grandaunts and uncles–niblings

Regular

Half

Adopted, step and foster

Great-grandaunts and uncles–niblings

Regular

Half

Adopted, step and foster

First cousins

Regular

Half

Adopted, step and foster

First cousins once removed

Regular

Half

Adopted, step and foster

First cousins twice removed

Regular

Half

Adopted, step and foster

Second cousins

Regular

Half

Adopted, step and foster

Second cousins once removed

Regular

Half

Adopted, step and foster

Second cousins twice removed

Regular

Half

Adopted, step and foster

Marriages

Regular

Common-law

Siblings in-law

Regular

Half

Adopted, step and foster

Co-siblings-in-law

Regular

Half

Adopted, step and foster

Parents–children in-law

See also 
List of family relations in American football
List of second-generation Major League Baseball players
List of second-generation National Basketball Association players
List of family relations in the NHL
List of rugby league families
List of association football families of note
List of international rugby union families
List of chess families
List of boxing families
List of professional sports families

References

External links 
Overview of relations at Wrestlingdata
The 9 Greatest Professional Wrestling Families
SLAM! Wrestling: 2nd-gen grapplers reflect on their Dads at SLAM! Sports
SLAM! Wrestling: Fathers find raising wrestlers a challenge at SLAM! Sports
SLAM! Wrestling: Family matters in pro wrestling at SLAM! Sports
Did You Know? Wrestling Families Edition (Part 1) at RingSideNews.com

Professional wrestling
 
Family relations